Shin Sang-woo (Hangul: 신상우; Hanja: 申相又; born March 10, 1976) is a South Korean former football player. He formerly Daejeon Citizen, Gwangju Sangmu, Seongnam Ilhwa, Incheon United and Gimhae City FC.

References

1976 births
Living people
South Korean footballers
Daejeon Hana Citizen FC players
Gimcheon Sangmu FC players
Seongnam FC players
Incheon United FC players
K League 1 players
Korea National League players
Association football midfielders